Tertuliano de Albuquerque Potiguara was a Brazilian Division General who was known for being a primary commander of the Contestado War but remained a controversial figure during the war due to being accused of committing war crimes.

Biography
Son of Antonio Domingos da Silva, Portuguese by birth, and of Rosa Cândida de Albuquerque, he was born in Serra da Meruoca within the land of Sobral, Ceará.

He was promoted to ensign on November 3, 1894 and to 1st lieutenant on June 6, 1907 and captain on April, 7 1909. He was also a personal friend of Floriano Peixoto. He served in the Federal Capital Police Brigade in the rank of major from 1910 to 1914. He then participated in both the Vaccine Revolt and the Contestado War but was a controversial figure at the latter due to being accused of war crimes during the war.

With Brazil's entry into World War I at the end of 1917, the Brazilian government sent a mission to France in 1918, in which Potiguara participated but was wounded in the Battle of St Quentin Canal. He was then was promoted to lieutenant colonel for acts of bravery practiced in the battles there. On 8 July 1921 he was promoted to colonel by merit, Brigadier General on January 20, 1923 and finally Major General on November 6, 1926.

Serving as a loyalist, he fought in the Paulista Revolt of 1924, commanding the Potiguara Brigade under General Eduardo Sócrates, fighting the rebel lieutenants of the São Paulo Armed Forces and Public Forces and leading the repression at Mooca. In 1932 , alongside the lieutenants he had fought 8 years earlier, he fought against the Constitutionalist Revolution.

He was elected federal deputy for Ceará in the First Republic. One day, upon receiving a package in the mail, the package contained dynamite which exploded, ripping off his arm. He then died at Rio de Janeiro at the age of 87.

References

Bibliography
 Martins, Vicente - Homens e vultos de Sobral. Fortaleza: Edições UFC, 1989.
 McCann, Frank D. - Soldados da Pátria: História do exército brasileiro, 1889-1937 Cia das Letras 2007 
 McCann, Frank D, 2004 Soldiers of the Patria, A History of the Brazilian Army, 1889–1937, Stanford University Press, 

1873 births
1957 deaths
Brazilian generals
People from Ceará
20th-century Brazilian military personnel